Lac Pavin is a meromictic crater lake located in the Puy-de-Dôme department of France, between Besse-en-Chandesse and Super-Besse. It gives its name to a cheese: Pavin cheese.

References

External links

Accumulation of mantle gases in a permanently stratified volcanic lake(Lac Pavin, France), 1999 paper concluding CO2 levels in Lac Pavin were not at the time in danger of a limnic eruption
ODD TRUTHS: THE MYSTERIES OF LAKE PAVIN blog by "The Thinker's Garden", 2017

Lakes of Puy-de-Dôme
Volcanic crater lakes
Meromictic lakes
Chaîne des Puys
Maars of France